Kung Fu Kid, also known as Shaolin Heroes, is a 1994 Hong Kong action film directed by Lee Chiu and starring Chin Ka-lok and Lam Ching-Ying.

Plot
Set during the time of the Ching Dynasty, Manchurian troops attempt to close a Shaolin temple. Temple disciple  (Lam Ching-Ying) and a young fighter called Feng Shi-Yu (Chin Ka-lok) fight against them.

Cast
Ching-Ying Lam as temple disciple Hong Zhi-Guan
Chin Ka-lok as Feng Shi-Yu a young fighter
Kwan Hoi-san as Feng Shi-Yu's father
Siqin Gaowa as Feng Shi-Yu's mother

References

External links
 
 

1994 martial arts films
1994 films
1990s Cantonese-language films
Hong Kong martial arts films
1990s Hong Kong films